Gompholobium cyaninum is a species of flowering plant in the family Fabaceae and is endemic to the south-west of Western Australia. It is an erect to straggling shrub with pinnate leaves and blue, purple and red, pea-like flowers.

Description
It has pinnate leaves with fifteen to nineteen leaflets with a stipule at the base of the leaf. Flowering occurs from September to December and the fruit is a cylindrical pod.

Taxonomy
Gompholobium cyaninum was first formally described in 2008 by Jennifer Anne Chappill in Australian Systematic Botany from specimens collected near Wandering in 2000. The specific epithet (cyaninum) means "deep blue".

Distribution and habitat
This pea grows in sandy to gravelly soil on plains slopes and valleys in the Avon Wheatbelt, Esperance Plains, Jarrah Forest, Mallee, Swan Coastal Plain and Warren biogeographic regions of south-western Western Australia.

Conservation status
Gompholobium cyaninum is classified as "not threatened" by the Western Australian Government Department of Parks and Wildlife.

References

cyaninum
Eudicots of Western Australia
Plants described in 2008